Throughout the history of Puerto Rico, its inhabitants have initiated several movements to obtain independence for the island, first from the Spanish Empire from 1493 to 1898 and since then from the United States.

A spectrum of pro-autonomy, pro-nationalism, and pro-independence sentiments and political parties exist on the island. Since the beginning of the 19th century, organizations advocating independence in Puerto Rico have attempted both peaceful political means as well as violent revolutionary actions to achieve its objectives. Since the second half of the 20th century, the independence movement has trailed significantly behind the pro-Commonwealth and pro-statehood movements at the ballots. In a status referendum in 2012, 5.5% voted for independence while Statehood obtained 61.1% of the votes cast. Independence also received the least support, less than 4.5% of the vote, in the status referendums in 1967, 1993 and 1998.

A fourth referendum was held in 2012, with 54% voting to change Puerto Rico's status but the federal government took no action to do so. The fifth plebiscite was held on June 11, 2017. With a voter turnout of 23%, it had the lowest turnout of any status referendum held in Puerto Rico. The independence option only received 1.35% of the vote in the referendum.

In the 2020 Puerto Rican general election, the Puerto Rican Independence Party achieved 13.6% of the vote, a significant increase in support from the 2016 Puerto Rican general election when it received only 2.1% of votes.

Seeking independence from Spain

Revolts by the Taíno

Some Modern Puerto Rican independence movements have claimed historic connection to the 16th century and the Taíno rebellion of 1511 led by Agüeybaná II. In this revolt, Agüeybaná II, the most powerful cacique at the time, together with Urayoán, cacique of Añasco, organized a revolt in 1511 against the Spaniards in the southern and western parts of the island. He was joined by Guarionex, cacique of Utuado, who attacked the village of Sotomayor (present-day Aguada) and killed 80 Spanish colonists. Juan Ponce de León led the Spaniards in a series of offensives that culminated in the Battle of Yagüecas. Agüeybaná II's people, who were armed only with spears, bows, and arrows, were no match for the guns of the Spanish forces, and Agüeybaná II was shot and killed in the battle. The revolt ultimately failed, and many Taíno either committed suicide or fled the island.

Puerto Ricans revolt
Several revolts against the Spanish rulers by the native born, or Criollos, occurred in the 19th century.  These include the conspiracy at San Germán in 1809, and the uprisings of people in Ciales, San Germán and Sabana Grande in 1898.

Many Puerto Ricans became inspired by the ideals of Simón Bolívar to liberate South America from Spanish rule. Bolívar sought to create a federation of Latin American nations, to include Puerto Rico and Cuba. Brigadier General Antonio Valero de Bernabé, also known as "The Liberator from Puerto Rico", fought for the independence of South America together with Bolívar; he also wanted an independent Puerto Rico.

María de las Mercedes Barbudo, the first female Puerto Rican Independentista, joined forces with the Venezuelan government, under the leadership of Simón Bolívar, to lead an insurrection against the Spanish colonial forces in Puerto Rico. The Spanish occupation forces were the object of more than thirty conspiracies. Some, like the Lares uprising, the riots and sedition of 1897 and the Secret Societies at the end of the 19th century, became popular rebellions. The most widespread popular revolts, however, were the one in Lares in 1868, and the one in Yauco in 1897.

In 1868, the Grito de Lares took place, in which revolutionaries occupied the town of Lares and declared the Republic of Puerto Rico. Ramón Emeterio Betances was the leader of this revolt. Earlier, Segundo Ruiz Belvis and Betances had founded the Comité Revolucionario de Puerto Rico (Revolutionary Committee of Puerto Rico) from their exile in the Dominican Republic. Betances wrote several Proclamas, or statements attacking the exploitation of the Puerto Ricans by the Spanish colonial system, and called for immediate insurrection. These statements were rapidly circulated throughout the island as local dissident groups began to organize.

Most dissidents were Criollos (born on the island). The critical state of the economy, along with the increasing repression imposed by the Spanish, served as catalysts for the rebellion. The stronghold of the movement were towns located on the mountains of the west of the island.  The rebels looted local stores and offices owned by peninsulares (Spanish-born residents) and took over the city hall. They took as prisoners Spanish merchants and local government officials. The revolutionaries placed their revolutionary flag (the first Puerto Rican flag) on the high altar of the church to signify that the revolution had begun. The Republic of Puerto Rico was proclaimed, and Francisco Ramírez Medina was proclaimed interim president. The revolutionaries offered immediate freedom to any slave who would join them.

In the next town, San Sebastián del Pepino, the Grito de Lares revolutionaries encountered heavy resistance from the Spanish militia and retreated to Lares.  The Spanish militia rounded up the rebels and quickly brought the insurrection to an end.  The government imprisoned some 475 rebels, and a military court imposed the death penalty, for treason and sedition, on all the prisoners.  But in Madrid, Eugenio María de Hostos and other prominent Puerto Ricans were successful in interceding, and the national government ordered a general amnesty and release of all the prisoners. Numerous leaders, such as Betances, Rojas, Lacroix, Aurelio Méndez and others, were sent into exile.

In 1896, a group of residents of Yauco who supported independence joined forces to overthrow the Spanish government in the island. The group was led by Antonio Mattei Lluberas, a wealthy coffee plantation owner, and Mateo Mercado. Later that year, the local Civil Guard discovered their plans and arrested all those involved. They were soon released and allowed to return home.

In 1897, Lluberas traveled to New York City and visited the Puerto Rican Revolutionary Committee, which included the exiled group from the 1868 Grito de Lares revolt. They made plans for a major coup in Puerto Rico. Lluberas returned to Puerto Rico with a Puerto Rican flag to be flown at such coup. The Mayor of Yauco, Francisco Lluch Barreras, learned of the planned uprising, and notified the island's Spanish governor. When Fidel Velez, one of the separatist leaders, learned that the word was out, he met with other leaders and forced them to begin the insurrection immediately.

On March 24, 1897, Velez and his men marched towards Yauco, planning to attack the barracks of the Spanish Civil Guard, to gain control of their arms and ammunition. At arrival, they were ambushed by Spanish forces. When a firefight broke out, the rebels quickly retreated.
On March 26, a group headed by Jose Nicolas Quiñones Torres and Ramon Torres fought Spanish colonial forces (mostly island men) in a barrio called Quebradas of Yauco, but were overcome. The government arrested more than 150 rebels, charged them with various crimes against the state, and sent them to prison in the City of Ponce. These attacks became known as the Intentona de Yauco (Attempted Coup of Yauco). It was the first time that the flag of Puerto Rico was flown on the island.

Velez fled to St. Thomas where he lived in exile. Mattei Lluberas went into exile in New York City, joining a group known as the "Puerto Rican Commission".

Spanish Charter of Autonomy
After four hundred years of colonial rule by the Spanish Empire, Puerto Rico finally received its sovereignty in 1897 through a Carta de Autonomía (Charter of Autonomy). It was signed by Spanish Prime Minister Práxedes Mateo Sagasta and ratified by the Spanish Cortes.

Seeking independence from the United States

A few months later, the United States claimed ownership of the island as part of the Treaty of Paris of 1898, which concluded the Spanish–American War, which they had won that year. On 19 February 1904, the Union of Puerto Rico party became the first mass party to advocate for independence for Puerto Rico in the form of a sovereign nation. Other "independence parties" were formed in reaction to the colonial status of Puerto Rico with the United States. The Puerto Rican Nationalist Party, founded 17 September 1922, also advocates independence. This party has since held that, by international law, the Spanish had no authority under the Treaty of Paris to cede the island, which was no longer theirs. The Nationalist movement attracted supporters following the repressions by the island government in the Ponce and the Río Piedras massacre. The profits generated by this one-sided arrangement were enormous, as US corporations developed large plantations.

Several years after leaving office, in 1913 Charles H. Allen, the first civilian U.S. governor of Puerto Rico, succeeded to the presidency of the American Sugar Refining Company after serving as treasurer. He resigned in 1915, but stayed on the board. The company operated the largest sugar-refining operation in the world and was later renamed as the Domino Sugar company. According to historian Federico Ribes Tovar, Charles Allen leveraged his governorship of Puerto Rico into a controlling interest over the entire Puerto Rican economy through Domino Sugar.

American professor and activist Noam Chomsky argued in the late 20th century that, after 1898 "Puerto Rico was turned into a plantation for U.S. agribusiness, later an export platform for taxpayer-subsidized U.S. corporations, and the site of major U.S. military bases and petroleum refineries." By 1930, over 40 percent of all the arable land in Puerto Rico had been converted into sugar plantations owned by Domino Sugar and U.S. banking interests. These bank syndicates also owned the insular postal system, the coastal railroad, and the San Juan international seaport.

Taking Puerto Rico was seen as a part of American "Manifest destiny." The American government supported American corporations with military force on occasion.

After Puerto Rico was invaded during the Spanish–American War in 1898, Manuel Zeno Gandía traveled to Washington, D.C. where, together with Eugenio María de Hostos, he proposed the idea of independence for Puerto Rico.  The men were disappointed when their ideas were rejected by the US government and the island was organized as a US territory.  Zeno Gandia returned to the island and continued as an activist.

A number of leaders, including a well-known intellectual and legislator called José de Diego, sought independence from the United States via political accommodation.  On June 5, 1900, President William McKinley named De Diego, together with Rosendo Matienzo Cintrón, José Celso Barbosa, Manuel Camuñas, and Andrés Crosas to an Executive Cabinet under U.S.-appointed Governor Charles H. Allen. The Executive Cabinet also included six American members.

De Diego resigned from the position in order to pursue independence. In 1904, he co-founded the Unionist Party along with Luis Muñoz Rivera, Rosendo Matienzo Cintrón and Antonio R. Barceló. De Diego was elected to the House of Delegates, the only locally elected body of government then allowed by the U.S., over which De Diego presided from 1904 to 1917. The House of Delegates was subject to the U.S. President's veto power and unsuccessfully voted for the island's right to independence and self-government. It petitioned against imposition of U.S. citizenship to Puerto Ricans in 1917, but the US granted citizenship to island residents. Despite these failures, De Diego became known as the "Father of the Puerto Rican Independence Movement."

The newly created Puerto Rico Union Party advocated allowing voters to choose among non-colonial options, including annexation, an independent protectorate, and full autonomy. Another new party called the Puerto Rico Independence Party emerged, founded by Rosendo Matienzo Cintrón in 1912, which promoted Puerto Rico's independence. That same year, Scott Colón, Zeno Gandía, Matienzo Cintrón, and Luis Lloréns Torres wrote a manifesto for independence. The Independence Party was the first party in the history of the island to openly support independence from the United States as part of its platform.

Through the 1930s, U.S. banking interests and corporations expanded their control of lands throughout Latin America.

Formation of the Nationalist Party

The main political parties in Puerto Rico have supported a continuing relationship with the United States and been supported by the electorate. By the 1940s voters had elected a majority of Partido Popular Democrático (PPD) members in the legislature. In 1952 they voted by nearly 82% in support of the new constitution of the Estado Libre Associado or Commonwealth. Sixty years later, a majority of those who voted on the second question of a 2012 referendum, to indicate what type of arrangement they preferred, voted to seek admission as a state into the United States. 61.16% voted for statehood, 33.34% voted for free association and 5.49% voted for independence. Hundreds of thousands of voters abstained from the question, so the proportion of voters for statehood was actually 45% of the total eligible electorate rather than a majority.

In 1919, Puerto Rico had two major organizations that supported independence: the Nationalist Youth and the Independence Association. Also in 1919, José Coll y Cuchí, a member of the Union Party of Puerto Rico, left the party and formed the Nationalist Association of Puerto Rico. In 1922, these three political organizations joined forces and formed the Puerto Rican Nationalist Party, with Coll y Cuchi as party president. The party's chief goal was to achieve independence from the United States. In 1924 Dr. Pedro Albizu Campos joined the party and was named vice-president.

On May 11, 1930, Pedro Albizu Campos was elected president of the Nationalist Party. Under his leadership, in the 1930s the party became the largest independence movement in Puerto Rico. But, after disappointing electoral outcomes and strong repression by the territorial police, by the mid-1930s Albizu opted against the electoral political process. He advocated violent revolution as the means to achieve independence.

In 1932, the pro-independence Liberal Party of Puerto Rico was founded by Antonio R. Barceló. The Liberal Party's political agenda was the same as that of the original Union Party, urging independence for Puerto Rico. Among those who joined him in the "new" party were Felisa Rincón de Gautier and Ernesto Ramos Antonini.

By 1932 Luis Muñoz Rivera's son, Luis Muñoz Marín, had also joined the Liberal Party. Muñoz Marín was eventually the first democratically elected Governor of Puerto Rico.

During the 1932 elections, the Liberal Party faced the Alliance, then a coalition of the Republican Party of Puerto Rico and Santiago Iglesias Pantin's Socialist Party. Barceló and Muñoz Marín were both elected Senators. By 1936, differences between Muñoz Marín and Barceló began to surface, as well as between those followers who considered Muñoz Marín the true leader and those who considered Barceló as their leader.

Muñoz Marín and his followers, who included Felisa Rincón de Gautier and Ernesto Ramos Antonini, held an assembly in the town of Arecibo to found the Partido Liberal, Neto, Auténtico y Completo (Clear, Authentic and Complete Liberal Party), later named the People's Democratic Party (PPD for Spanish name).
During the 1930s and 1940s, Nationalist partisans took part in violent incidents:

 On April 6, 1932, Nationalist partisans marched into the Capitol building in San Juan to protest the legislative proposal to approve the present Puerto Rican flag, the official flag of the insular government. Nationalists preferred the flag used during the Grito de Lares.
 On October 24, 1935, a confrontation with police at University of Puerto Rico, Río Piedras campus, killed four Puerto Rican Nationalist Party supporters and one policeman. The event came to be known as the Río Piedras massacre.
 On February 23, 1936, Colonel Elisha Francis Riggs, formerly of the US Army and the highest police officer in the island, was assassinated in retaliation for the Río Piedras events by Nationalists Hiram Rosado and Elías Beauchamp. Rosado and Beauchamp were arrested, and summarily executed without a trial at the police headquarters in San Juan.

 On March 21, 1937, a march in Ponce by the Puerto Rican Nationalist Party, organized to commemorate the ending of slavery in Puerto Rico, resulted in the deaths of 17 unarmed citizens and 2 policemen at the hands of the territorial police, an event known as the Ponce massacre.
 In 1936, the U.S. Senator Millard Tydings presented a legislative proposal to grant independence to Puerto Rico, but many people believed that it had unfavorable economic conditions. Barceló and the Liberal Party favored the Bill, because it would give Puerto Rico its independence; Muñoz Marín opposed the Bill because he wanted Puerto Rico's immediate independence but with favorable conditions.
 On July 25, 1938, shots were fired at the US colonial governor, Blanton Winship during a parade; they killed Police Colonel Luis Irizarry. Soon afterward, two Nationalist partisans attempted to assassinate Robert Cooper, judge of the Federal Court in Puerto Rico. Winship tried to suppress the Nationalists.
 On June 10, 1948, the United States-appointed Governor of Puerto Rico, Jesús T. Piñero, signed into law a bill passed by the Puerto Rican Senate, which was controlled by elected PPD representatives. It prohibited discussion of independence, militant independence activism, and significantly curtailed other Puerto Rican independence activities. The Ley de la Mordaza (Gag Law) also made it illegal to sing a patriotic song, and reinforced the 1898 law that had made it illegal to display the Flag of Puerto Rico, with anyone found guilty of disobeying the law in any way being subject to a sentence of up to ten years imprisonment, a fine of up to US$10,000, or both.

Events under Commonwealth status

The Puerto Rican independence movement took new measures after the Free Associate State was authorized.  On October 30, 1950, with the new autonomist Commonwealth status about to go into effect, multiple Nationalist uprisings occurred, in an effort to focus world attention on the Movement's dissatisfaction with the new commonwealth status.

They catalyzed roughly a dozen skirmishes throughout Puerto Rico including Peñuelas, the Jayuya Uprising, the Utuado Uprising, the San Juan Nationalist revolt, and other shootouts in Mayagüez, Naranjito, and Arecibo. During the 1950 Jayuya Uprising, Blanca Canales declared Puerto Rico a free republic. Two days after the creation of the Commonwealth, two Nationalists attempted to assassinate US President Harry S. Truman in Washington, DC.

Acknowledging the importance of the question of Puerto Rican status, Truman supported a plebiscite in Puerto Rico in 1952 on the new constitution, to determine the status of the island's relationship to the U.S. The people voted by nearly 82% in favor of the new constitution and Free Associated State, or Commonwealth. Nationalists criticized the constitution because the Commonwealth was subject to US laws and to approval by the US executive and legislative branches of government, branches which Puerto Ricans did not participate in electing.  As the government suppressed the Nationalist leaders, their political activities and influence waned.

In the 1954 United States Capitol shooting incident, four nationalists opened fire on US Representatives during a debate on the floor of the US Congress, wounding five men, one seriously. The Nationalists were tried and convicted in federal court and sentenced effectively to life imprisonment. In 1978 and 1979, their sentences were commuted by President Jimmy Carter to time served, and they were allowed to return to Puerto Rico.

In the 1960s, the United States received international criticism for holding onto the world's oldest colony. By the 1960s, a new phase of the Puerto Rican independence movement began. Several organizations began to use "clandestine armed struggle" against the US government. Underground "people's armies" such as Movimiento Independentista Revolucionario en Armas (MIRA), Comandos Armados de Liberación (CAL), Fuerzas Armadas de Liberación Nacional (FALN), Organización de Voluntarios por la Revolución Puertorriqueña (OVRP), The Ejército Popular Boricua (EPB), and others began engaging in subversive activities against the US government and military to bring attention to the colonial condition of Puerto Rico. In 1977, Rubén Berríos Martínez, then the President of the Puerto Rican Independence Party, wrote a long and detailed article in Foreign Affairs that declared that the 'only solution' was independence for Puerto Rico.

Political support
A number of social groups, political parties, and individuals worldwide have supported the concept of Puerto Rican independence. On the island itself, it is a fringe but intense movement, with the Washington Post reporting that "calls for Puerto Rico's independence have existed since the days of Spanish colonial rule and continued after the United States seized control of the island in 1898 ... although many Puerto Ricans express deep patriotism for the island, the independence impulse has never translated in the polls."

The Democratic Party in the United States asserted in its 2012 platform that it "will continue to work on improving Puerto Rico's economic status by promoting job creation, education, health care, clean energy, and economic development on the Island." The Republican Party asserts that it "support[s] the right of the United States citizens of Puerto Rico to be admitted to the Union as a fully sovereign state if they freely so determine," that Congress should "define the constitutionally valid options for Puerto Rico" to gain permanent non-territorial status, and said that, while Puerto Rico's status should be supported by a referendum sponsored by "the U.S. government." Neither of the two major parties in Puerto Rico supports independence: the Popular Democratic Party supports the current status of Puerto Rico as a self-governing unincorporated territory, and the New Progressive Party of Puerto Rico supports statehood.

Minority parties have expressed different positions: in 2005, Communist Party USA passed a resolution about Puerto Rico, condemning American imperialism, "colonialism," etc., while stating that "the Communist Party of the USA ... continues its support for independence of Puerto Rico and the transfer of all sovereign powers to Puerto Rico." Their platform supported the people's "acquisition of their internationally recognized right to independence and self-determination ..." In 2012, the Green Party of the United States had a platform supporting independence. Socialist Party USA does not support independence for Puerto Rico, but calls for "full representation for the U.S. territories of Guam and Puerto Rico, all Native American reservations, and the District of Columbia."

During the summit of the Community of Latin American and Caribbean States in Havana, Cuba in January 2014, Nicolas Maduro, the President of Venezuela, told The Wall Street Journal that he supported Puerto Rican independence, saying that "it's an embarrassment that Latin America and the Caribbean in the 21st century still have colonies. Let the imperial elites of the U.S. say whatever they want." Also at this summit, the president of Argentina, Cristina Fernández de Kirchner, pledged to vote for independence of Puerto Rico; and Raúl Castro "called for an independent Puerto Rico."

Other individuals and groups supporting Puerto Rican independence have included: poet Martín Espada, professor and writer Jason Ferreira, the group Calle 13, FALN leader Oscar López Rivera, Roberto Barreto, a member of Organizacion Socialista Internacional; Puerto Rican nationalist Carlos Alberto Torres, and US Representative Luis Gutiérrez.

20th century to present

Levinson and Sparrow in their 2005 book suggest the Foraker Act, and the Jones–Shafroth Act reduced political opposition in the island, as they vested the U.S. Congress with authority and veto power over any legislation or referendum initiated by Puerto Rico.

Founded in 1922, the Puerto Rican Nationalist Party worked for independence. In 1946, Gilberto Concepción de Gracia founded the Puerto Rican Independence Party (PIP). It has continued to participate in the island's electoral process.

In the mid-century, the "Cointelpro program" was a project conducted by the United States Federal Bureau of Investigation (FBI) to surveil, infiltrate, discredit, and disrupt domestic political organizations which it classified as suspect or subversive. The police documented thousands of extensive carpetas (files) concerning individuals of all social groups and ages. Approximately 75,000 persons were listed as under political police surveillance. Historians and critics found that the massive surveillance apparatus was directed primarily against Puerto Rico's independence movement. As a result, many independence supporters moved to the Popular Democratic Party to support its opposition to statehood.

In the 21st century, a majority of Independentistas seek to achieve independence either through peaceful political means or violent revolutionary actions. The Independence Party has elected some legislative candidates, but in recent elections has not won more than a small percentage of votes for its gubernatorial candidates (2.04% in 2008) or the legislative elections (4.5-5% of the island-wide legislative vote in 2008).

In March 2023, a diaspora group petitioned the United States Congress to create an American-Puerto Rican Commission to promote the decolonization and independence of Puerto Rico from the United States of America.

United Nations' view

Since 1953, the United Nations has been considering the Political status of Puerto Rico and how to assist it in achieving "independence" or "decolonization". In 1978, the Special Committee determined that a "colonial relationship" existed between the US and Puerto Rico.

Note that the UN's Special Committee has often referred to Puerto Rico as a nation in its reports, because, internationally, the people of Puerto Rico are often considered to be a Caribbean nation with their own national identity. Most recently, in a June 2016 report, the Special Committee called for the United States to expedite the process to allow self-determination in Puerto Rico. More specifically, the group called on the United States to expedite a process that would allow the people of Puerto Rico to exercise fully their right to self-determination and independence: "allow the Puerto Rican people to take decisions in a sovereign manner, and to address their urgent economic and social needs, including unemployment, marginalization, insolvency and poverty".

2012 status referendum

In a status referendum in 2012, which had a two-part vote, 5.5% voted for independence. Analysts noted that the results were ambiguous because of issues related to the structure of questions and supporters of the commonwealth status urging voters to abstain from voting on the second question. Journalist Roque Planas, co-founder of the Latin American News Dispatch, wrote as an editor in HuffPost:

Similarly, as reported by the New York Daily News, Juan Gonzalez, journalist and a co-host of the TV show Democracy Now! said:

In October 2013, The Economist reported on the island economy's "dire financial straits." Referring to the 2012 referendum, it said that "Puerto Rico is unlikely to become a state any time soon. Because the island remains a territory, the decision is ultimately out of boricuas''' hands ... the legislature is highly unlikely to prioritise a Puerto Rican statehood bill ... the Republican Party would surely use every tactic at its disposal to block a statehood bill," as the island voters have been overwhelmingly supportive of Democratic Party presidential candidates and could be expected to vote for the same party for Congressional seats if statehood were approved by Congress.

The Washington Post reported in December 2013 that, since Puerto Ricans became US citizens in 1917, they have "been divided over their relationship with the mainland" on whether to become a US state, become independent, or a self-governing territory under US control.

2017 status referendum

The previous plebiscites provided voters with three options: statehood, free association, and independence. The 2017 referendum offered three options: Statehood, Commonwealth and Independence/Free Association. If the majority vote for the latter, a second vote will be held to determine the preference: full independence as a nation or associated free state status with independence but with a "free and voluntary political association" between Puerto Rico and the United States.

The White House Task Force on Puerto Rico offers the following specifics:
"Free Association is a type of independence. A compact of Free Association would establish a mutual agreement that would recognize that the United States and Puerto Rico are closely linked in specific ways as detailed in the compact. Compacts of this sort are based on the national sovereignty of each country, and either nation can unilaterally terminate the association." The content of the Compact of Free Association might cover topics such as the role of the US military in Puerto Rico, the use of the U.S. currency, free trade between the two entities, and whether Puerto Ricans would be U.S. citizens.

Former Governor Ricardo Rosselló was strongly in favor of statehood to help develop the economy and help to "solve our 500-year-old colonial dilemma ... Colonialism is not an option . ... It's a civil rights issue ... 3.5 million citizens seeking an absolute democracy," he told the news media. Benefits of statehood include an additional $10 billion per year in federal funds, the right to vote in presidential elections, higher Social Security and Medicare benefits, and a right for its government agencies and municipalities to file for bankruptcy. The latter is currently prohibited.

At approximately the same time as the referendum, Puerto Rico's legislators voted on a bill that allows the Governor to draft a state constitution and hold elections to choose senators and representatives to the federal Congress. Regardless of the outcome of the 2017 referendum and the bill, action by the United States Congress will be necessary to implement changes to the status of Puerto Rico under the Territorial Clause of the United States Constitution.

See also

 Puerto Rico Democracy Act of 2007
 Latin American and Caribbean Congress in Solidarity with Puerto Rico's Independence
 Latin America-United States relations
 Fuerzas Armadas de Liberación Nacional (Puerto Rico)
 Puerto Rico (proposed state)
 Proposed political status for Puerto Rico
 Sovereigntism (Puerto Rico)
 Special Committee on Decolonization
 United Nations list of non-self-governing territories

References

Further reading
 Historia del Movimiento Pro Independencia--antecesor historico del MINH. Wilma E. Reverón Collazo. Introducción a la historia del MPI en el 160 Aniversario del Natalicio de Eugenio María de Hostos. Capaprieto /Movimiento Independentista Nacional Hostosiano - Mayagüez. Mayagüez, Puerto Rico.  11 January 1999. Retrieved 4 Juna 2011.
 Go, J. (2000). "Chains of Empire, Projects of State: Political Education and U.S. Colonial Rule in Puerto Rico and the Philippines." Comparative Studies in Society and History, 42''(2), 333-362.

External links
 Portraits of Notable Individuals in the Struggle for Puerto Rican Independence

Independence movements
COINTELPRO targets
Political advocacy groups in Puerto Rico
Political history of Puerto Rico
 
Separatism in the United States
Puerto Rican nationalism
Anti-Americanism